Ghandhara Nissan Limited is a Pakistani automobile manufacturer based in Karachi, Pakistan established in 1981. Ghandhara Nissan is the authorized assembler and manufacturer of Nissan, Dongfeng, JAC and Renault Trucks vehicles in Pakistan.

History
Ghandara Nissan was incorporated in 1981 for the distribution of completely built-up (CBU) Nissan vehicles in Pakistan. In 1992, it became a publicly listed company on the Karachi Stock Exchange. Ghandhara Nissan has a technical assistance agreement with Nissan Motors and a joint venture agreement with Nissan Diesel for the progressive assembly of passenger vehicles, light commercial vehicles and heavy duty vehicles. Ghandhara Nissan's manufacturing and assembly plant which has a capacity of 6,000 cars per year, is located at Port Qasim, Karachi.

Ghandhara Nissan forms one of several companies of Bibojee Services. In 2016, Renault announced to start assembling cars in Pakistan by 2018 in collaboration with Ghandhara Nissan. but suspended further talks with Ghandhara Nissan and collaborated with new partner Al-Futtaim Group of United Arab Emirates (UAE).

In March 2018, Nissan signed a manufacturing and licensing agreement with Ghandhara Nissan to begin local production of Datsun models.

Products

Nissan Motor

Nissan Cars 
(Nissan magnite and Nissan sunny and Nissan patrol and Nissan kicks and Nissan micra coming soon)

Chery 

 Chery Tiggo 4 Pro
 Chery Tiggo 8 Pro

Commercial Vehicles

Dongfeng Trucks 
As of 2015, it was hoped that Dongfeng trucks would be able to carve out a big share in the Pakistani market for trucks due to Pak-China Economic Corridor (CPEC) projects. Pakistan is also witnessing an increased demand in heavy trucks due to CPEC and relative improvement in the country's security situation.
 Dongfeng DF210 (4x2)
 Dongfeng DF230 (4x2)
 Dongfeng DF260 (6x4)
 Dongfeng DF280 (6x4)
 Dongfeng DF340 (6x4)
 Dongfeng DF375 (6x4)/(8x4)
 Realing M
 Captain C

Renault Trucks 
 D-280 (Medium Truck)
 C-380 (Medium-Heavy Truck)
 K-380 (Heavy Truck)

JAC Motors 
 X200 (Light-Medium Truck)
 1020K (Medium Truck)
 1042K (Medium Truck)
T6 (Double Cab Pickup) (Coming soon)

See also
 Ghandhara Industries
 Automobile industry in Pakistan

References

External links

Nissan Motor Company

Nissan
Car manufacturers of Pakistan
Bus manufacturers of Pakistan
Truck manufacturers of Pakistan
Pakistani subsidiaries of foreign companies
Manufacturing companies based in Karachi
Vehicle manufacturing companies established in 1981
Pakistani companies established in 1981
Companies listed on the Pakistan Stock Exchange